Lacanobia subjuncta, the speckled cutworm, is a species of cutworm or dart moth in the family Noctuidae. It is found in North America.

The MONA or Hodges number for Lacanobia subjuncta is 10299.

References

Further reading

External links

 

Lacanobia
Articles created by Qbugbot
Moths described in 1868